Claudio Costa Neto (born Rio de Janeiro, December 11, 1932) is a Brazilian chemical and chemical engineer, one of the founders of the Institute of Chemistry, UFRJ. He is currently  emeritus professor at the Institute of Chemistry of the Federal University of Rio de Janeiro.

History 
He got his BSc degree in Industrial Chemistry and Chemical Engineering from the University of Brazil (currently Universidade Federal do Rio de Janeiro) in 1954, Costa Neto worked under supervision of Fritz Feigl, responsible for the development of spot tests for identification and characterization of substances. He was responsible for creating the pioneering shale oil project ("projeto xistoquímica" in Portuguese). He was also responsible for the study of organic geochemistry at UFRJ.

Books 
Vila Rosário: trilogy about chemistry and society: first part: why and how to eliminate tuberculosis in a society, Claudio Costa Neto, Rio de Janeiro, Calamus Publisher, 480 pages, 2002.

Organic analysis: methods and procedures for characterizing organochemicals, Claudio Costa Neto, Rio de Janeiro, UFRJ publisher, 2004, Volumes 1 and 2 

People from Rio de Janeiro (city)
Brazilian chemical engineers
1932 births
Living people